Dazz is a 1979 album by R&B band Kinsman Dazz released on 20th Century Records. The album reached No. 62 on the Billboard Top R&B Albums chart.

Overview
Artists such as Philip Bailey appeared upon the album.

The lead single, "Catchin' Up on Love" peaked at No. 33 on the Billboard Hot R&B Singles chart.

Track listing
 Dancin' Free
 I Searched Around
 Love Design
 Keep On Rockin'
 Catchin' Up on Love
 Can't Get Enough

References

1979 albums
20th Century Fox Records albums
Albums produced by Philip Bailey